David Suter (born 1949)  is an American artist known for his many years producing editorial illustrations for clients such as The Washington Post, Time, and The New York Times. Known as "Suterisms" or "visual koans", his illustrations are notable for their use of bistable perception, in which Suter combines multiple images and concepts into a single image. Suter is also an accomplished fine art painter and sculptor.

Biography and illustration career 
Suter grew up in Bethesda, Maryland, the son of Richard Sturgis Suter, who worked in the CIA, and Angela Phillips Suter, an artist.  He was influenced early on by the mathematically inspired work of M. C. Escher, but never had any formal art training.

Suter attended a number of different colleges, not graduating from any of them. Drafted into the Army during the Vietnam War, he spent his deployment in West Germany.

Upon returning to the U.S., Suter got work at The Washington Post as an illustrator, for a while working as a courtroom artist during the Watergate scandal trials.

Suter was awarded a Michigan Journalism Fellowship in 1977, where he spent a year studying fine art, philosophy, and history at the University of Michigan. Upon completion of the fellowship, in 1978, Suter moved to New York City to pursue editorial illustration full-time. He quickly become sought-after by such publications as The New York Times (both on the op-ed page and the book review), Time magazine (for whom he did a number of covers), Harper's Magazine, and the Chicago Tribune.

In a mid-1980s magazine profile, Suter described his work this way:

For many years, Suter has been working on creating a full-length animation of the complete text of Shakespeare's Hamlet.

In the late 2000s he retired from editorial illustration to work full-time on his painting and sculpture practices.

Fine art 
The first exhibition of Suter's fine art—which he terms "Constructivist Expressionist"—was in 1996 at the Morgan Rank Gallery in East Hampton, New York.

In 2011, he was arrested and detained in Serbia while transporting his paintings from France to Romania for a gallery show in Bucharest.

Personal life 
Suter has four daughters: Valerie, Georgia, Charlotte, and Olivia.

Quotes

Bibliography 
 (illustrator) Coming to Terms, by Wayne Biddle (Viking, 1981) 
 Suterisms (Ballantine Books/Available Press, 1986) 
 (illustrator) Keep Your Brain Alive, by Lawrence C. Katz and Robin Manning (Workman, 1999)

References

External links 
 Suter's Suterisms website
 Suter Art and Sculpture website
 Gallery of Suter paintings & sculptures at Alex Gallery's website

American illustrators
Mathematical artists
The New York Review of Books
1949 births
Living people
University of Michigan fellows